Ralph Lawson Moffitt (18 September 1932 – 18 October 2003) was an English professional golfer. He played in the 1961 Ryder Cup.

Moffitt was born in Ryton, Tyne and Wear in 1932.

Career 
Moffitt tied for first place in the 1960 Dunlop Tournament and was runner-up to Peter Thomson in the 1961 News of the World Matchplay. Moffitt finished 8th in the Ryder Cup points list to gain a place in the 1961 Ryder Cup team. He was only selected for one match, a singles against Mike Souchak which he lost 5&4.

Moffitt won the 1962 Royal Gold Tournament and was runner-up three straight years at the Dunlop Masters from 1962 to 1964.

Moffitt was an assistant professional at Coventry Golf Club before spending 24 years as the club professional at Hearsall Golf Club. In 1979 he moved to Gorleston Golf Club at Gorleston, Great Yarmouth and retired there in 1992. He died at his home in Great Yarmouth aged 71.

Professional wins
This list may be incomplete.
1960 Dunlop Tournament (tie with Eric Brown)
1962 Royal Gold Tournament

Results in major championships

Note: Moffitt only played in The Open Championship.

CUT = missed the half-way cut (3rd round cut in 1971 Open Championship)
"T" indicates a tie for a place

Team appearances
Ryder Cup (representing Great Britain): 1961

References

English male golfers
Ryder Cup competitors for Europe
People from Ryton, Tyne and Wear
Sportspeople from Tyne and Wear
Sportspeople from Great Yarmouth
1932 births
2003 deaths